Madhana is a village located in Dhimarkheda Block, Katni, Madhya Pradesh, India. Madhana old name is madhogarh. It has historical importance as the great warrior allaha and uddal took their father revenge at the age of 12. Madhana came under rule of King kalia who killed Allah/Uddal father when they were just 11/9 year old. Allah killed Kalia at 12 age and he was true warrior of that time. At present Mr Govind Pratap s/o late SHIVRAJ Bahadur is sarpanch of Madhana.

Demographics
Per the 2011 Census of India, Madhana had a total population of 947. Of the population 481 were male and 466 were female.

Geography
The total geographical area of village is 667 hectares.

Administration
Madhana is a gram panchayat in Dhimarkheda Tehsil. Currently Govind Pratap Singh is the pradhan (sarpanch) of the Madhana village.

References 

Cities and towns in Katni district